The Smith & Wesson M&P15 is an AR-15 style semi-automatic rifle by gun manufacturer Smith & Wesson. Introduced in 2006, the firearm is designed for police use and consumer markets.

History
"M&P" stands for "Military & Police" and is used to pay homage to the Smith & Wesson .38 Military & Police revolver.  According to the company, the .38 Military & Police, now known as the Model 10 revolver, has been in continuous production since 1899, and over six million units have been produced."

The M&P15 was introduced at the 2006 SHOT Show in two varieties: the M&P15 and the M&P15T.  Both are basically the same rifle, chambered in 5.56×45mm NATO, with the T-model featuring folding sights and a four-sided accessories rail fore end. They include the standard direct impingement gas system. In order to decrease cost on the original design both the dust cover and forward assist were omitted. These rifles were initially produced for S&W by Stag Arms, but marked and marketed under the Smith & Wesson name. Currently, Smith & Wesson makes the lower receiver in-house, while the barrel is supplied by Thompson/Center Arms, an S&W company acquired in 2007.

Smith & Wesson's total rifle production has increased through the years since it entered the rifle market. In the past, the company had marketed rifles and shotguns made by other manufacturers, but had not manufactured a long gun in house since World War II to fulfill a British military contract. Smith & Wesson made this entry into the long gun market because it was estimated in 2007 as a $1.1 billion market, 80% larger than the U.S. handgun market.

In May 2008, Smith & Wesson introduced their first AR-15 rifle in new caliber, the model M&P15R,  a standard AR platform rifle chambered for the Russian 5.45×39mm cartridge. This was due to the availability cheap surplus Communist Bloc 5.45mm ammunition and AK-series weapons. It had a 16-inch barrel, 6-position collapsible stock and a stainless-steel 30-round magazine. However, few shooters wanted an expensive AR-15 clone in a non-standard caliber that needed special magazines. As a result, the model was abandoned in 2011 due to poor sales.

Smith & Wesson announced their first short-stroke gas piston action rifle, the S&W M&P15 PS and PSX (piston AR-15) in January 2009.

The S&W M&P15 Sport and S&W M&P15 Whisper were released in 2011.  The Smith & Wesson M&P10, a version of the AR-10, was introduced in 2013.

Smith & Wesson's M&P15 Sport II was introduced in 2016. It includes additional features of a forward bolt assist and dust cover not found on the original M&P15 model.

Design

The rifle model is based on the AR-15. Smith & Wesson offers the M&P15 semi-automatic rifles in different configurations, tailored to specific shooting applications and styles. The rifle has different models that come chambered in 5.56mm NATO/.223 Remington, .22 Long Rifle, and 5.45×39mm. The barrels come with either a melonite lined or chrome-lined 4140 steel rifling, and 7075 T6 aluminum receiver with a hard-coat black anodized finish.

The Standard model has an adjustable CAR-15 stock and comes with 10-round or 30-round magazine. The Compliant model (designed for the California market) has a CAR-15 stock fixed in the open position (with an overall length of 33.75 inches) and comes with 10-round magazines.

The Smith & Wesson Performance Center target shooting version has an 18-inch bull barrel threaded to take any AR-15/M16-style compensator, a free-floated forend, integral Picatinny rail system and ships with a 10-round magazine.

Official users 

  United States Internal Revenue Service, Criminal Investigative Division
  Las Vegas Metropolitan Police Department
  Maricopa County Sheriff's Office: M&P15 MOE Mid
  West Virginia State Police

M&P15-22
The M&P15-22 is the blowback-operated, .22 Long Rifle version of the M&P15. It is made with a polymer upper and lower receiver.

References

External links 

 Smith & Wesson webpage on the M&P rifles

5.56×45mm NATO semi-automatic rifles
ArmaLite AR-10 derivatives
Rifles of the United States
Smith & Wesson firearms
AR-15 style rifles
Weapons and ammunition introduced in 2006